HMS Severn was a 50-gun fourth-rate ship of the line of the Royal Navy, launched at Blackwall Yard in 1695.

On 13 May 1734, orders were issued for Severn to be taken to pieces and rebuilt at Plymouth according to the 1733 proposals of the 1719 Establishment. Severn was relaunched on 28 March 1739, and served until 1746, when she was captured by the French.

Severn was captured back, yet again, by the British at the second Battle of Cape Finisterre on 25 October 1747; but not taken back into service.

See also
 List of ships captured in the 18th century

Notes

References

 Lavery, Brian (2003) The Ship of the Line - Volume 1: The development of the battlefleet 1650-1850. Conway Maritime Press. .
 Winfield, Rif (2009) British Warships in the Age of Sail: 1603-1714. Seaforth Publishing. .
 Winfield, Rif (2007) British Warships in the Age of Sail: 1714-1792. Seaforth Publishing. .

External links
 

Ships of the line of the Royal Navy
1690s ships
Ships built by the Blackwall Yard
Captured ships